Kholagram Mathiura union is a union parishad in Beanibazar Upazila, Sylhet District, Bangladesh.

Geography

It has 27,089 units of household and a total area of 253.22 km2.

Demographics

As of the 1991 Bangladesh census, Mathiura Union had a population of around 30,547, 49.5% of whom are male and 50.5% are female.

List of villages
 Arengabad
 Bejgram (Nasirabad)
 Doakha
 Dulovkha
 Dudbokshi
 Kandi Gram
 Khola Gram
 Menarai 
 Nal Bohar
 Pochim Per
 Purbo Per
 Purush Pal
 Raybashi
 Sheiklal (Sutton)
 Sutar Kandi
 Uttor Per

List of high schools
 Mathiura Dipakhik High School
 Nalbohor High School
 Mathiura Girls High School
 The New Generation Ideal High School

List of madrasah
 Mathiura Senior Fazil Madrasa
 Mathiura Bazar Hafiziya Madrasa
 Purush Pal Hafizia Madrasa
 Nalbohor Miftahul Jannah Madrasah

List of primary schools
 Aurangabad Primary School
 Bejgram Primary School
 Centre Mathiura Govt Model Primary School
 Doakha Primary School
 Dudbokshi Primary School
 Raybashi (govt.)primary school
 Kandi Gram Primary School
 Khola Gram Primary School
 Menarai Primary School (first primary school in korimgang mohokuma).
 Nal Bohar Primary School
 Pochim Per Primary School
 Kandro Mathiura Govt Primary School
 Purush Pal Wasiria Government Primary School
 Sheikhlal Primary School
 Sutar Kandi Primary School
 Uttor Per Primary School
 Sheikhlal Primary School

Health care: hospital
 Mathiura Bazar Hospital

References

Unions of Beanibazar Upazila